Lauritz Johnson (September 21, 1906 – February 7, 1992) was a Norwegian novelist, children's writer, and radio and television host. He was born in Nøtterøy, and was the grandson of Gisle Johnson. Nicknamed "Uncle Lauritz", he primarily worked on children's shows, eventually heading the children- and youth department of the Norwegian Broadcasting Corporation. He published the novels Mens vi venter from 1934 and Verden det er meg from 1945.

References

1906 births
1992 deaths
People from Nøtterøy
Norwegian radio personalities
NRK people
Norwegian children's writers
20th-century Norwegian novelists